Jacques D'Amours (born 1956/1957) is a Canadian billionaire businessman, and a director and co-founder of the convenience store chain Couche-Tard.

Career
D'Amours co-founded Couche-Tard in 1980, the youngest of the four co-founders. He is the second-largest shareholder in the company. D'Amours has been a billionaire since 2005.

On September 1, 2021, Couche-Tard announced the election details of directors and Jacques D'Amours was in a nominee.

Personal life
He is married with two children and lives in Montreal, Quebec.

References

Living people
Canadian billionaires
Canadian company founders
1950s births
Businesspeople from Montreal